The First Battle of Chamkaur was fought in 1702 between the Sikhs and the Mughals. It resulted in a Sikh victory and Mughal General Sayyad Beg joined the Sikh's with some troops.

Before the battle 
Guru Gobind Singh was making his way to Anandpur. He halted in Chamkaur. Mughal troops led by Generals Sayyad Beg and Alif Khan were marching from Lahore to Delhi. They were seen marching by Ajmer Chand. He requested to the Genreals to join him and promised to pay them 2,000 rupees per day. The Mughal army, along with hill forces from the Rajas made an attack on the Guru.

The battle 
The Mughal army and the army of the Hill Rajas attacked. There were only a small army of Sikhs with the Guru. Sayyad Beg felt the aggression on peace was unwarranted. With heavy fighting in the progress he along with some of his troops joined the Sikhs. Alif Khan alone could not fight. He withdrew his troops and made his troops march to Delhi.

Aftermath 
The Guru along with his Sikhs returned to Anandpur and Sayyad Beg joined him.

References 

Chamkaur
Chamkaur
1702 in India
Chamkaur